Andelfingen may refer to:

Andelfingen, Germany, a village in Biberach district
Andelfingen District, Canton of Zürich, Switzerland
Andelfingen, Switzerland, a municipality in the district
Andelfingen railway station